Camellocossus osmanya is a moth in the family Cossidae. It is found in Somalia.

References

Natural History Museum Lepidoptera generic names catalog

Cossinae
Moths described in 2011
Moths of Africa